Mivtahim (lit. Safe Havens) is a moshav in southern Israel. Located in the Hevel Eshkol area of the north-western Negev desert near the Gaza Strip border and covering an area of 4,000 dunams, it falls under the jurisdiction of Eshkol Regional Council.

History
The village was first established on 7 January 1947 as a kibbutz of the HaOved HaTzioni movement. Its name is taken from Isaiah 32:18:
And my people shall abide in a peaceable habitation, and in secure dwellings, and in quiet resting-places.

On 22 April 1948 there was a severe clash between the British Army and guards of the kibbutz, with armed units including tanks arriving at the gates. During the 1948 Arab–Israeli War residents decided to evacuate Mivtahim and join with residents of Nitzanim to found a new kibbutz. All that remains today of the original settlement is a security building.

In 1950 a moshav was founded adjacent to the abandoned kibbutz by immigrants from Kurdistan. In 1954 they were joined by immigrants from Morocco and more from Kurdistan. The moshav was used as an infantry base by the IDF during the Suez Crisis.

References

Moshavim
Populated places established in 1947
Gaza envelope
1947 establishments in Mandatory Palestine
Populated places in Southern District (Israel)